Rodman Wanamaker (October 10, 1899 – February 3, 1976) was an American polo player. He competed in the polo tournament at the 1924 Summer Olympics winning a silver medal.

References

External links
 

1899 births
1976 deaths
American polo players
Polo players at the 1924 Summer Olympics
Olympic medalists in polo
Olympic polo players of the United States
Olympic silver medalists for the United States
Medalists at the 1924 Summer Olympics
Sportspeople from Philadelphia